Gerret Willemsz. Heda (1620/25, in Haarlem – 1647/59, in Haarlem), was a Dutch Golden Age painter; known for fruit still lifes and vanitas paintings.

He was the son and pupil of Willem Claesz Heda, and influenced the still life painter Jan Jansz. Treck.

References

Further reading
Gerret Willemsz. Heda on Artnet

External links

1625 births
1649 deaths
Dutch Golden Age painters
Dutch male painters
Artists from Haarlem
Dutch still life painters